National Route 22 is a highway in southern Vietnam stretching from the northwestern outskirts of Ho Chi Minh City, the commercial centre of the country, towards the Cambodian border to the northwest. It is the main route for trade and traffic between Cambodia and southern Vietnam. Under French administration, this highway was designated National Road 1.

The highway starts on the northwestern outskirts of Ho Chi Minh City, near Hóc Môn. The highway passes through the town of Củ Chi before reaching Trảng Bàng and Gò Dầu near the Cambodian border. At Gò Dầu, one branch, Route 22A, diverges into the border town of Mộc Bài before crossing the border and becoming National Highway 1 in Cambodia while National Route 22B continues northwest into Tây Ninh Province, the heartland of the Cao Dai religion before reaching the provincial capital of Tây Ninh. The highway continues north, reaching a border crossing at the town of Trai Bi and becoming National Route 1 in Bavet in Svay Rieng Province on the Cambodian border where it leads to Phnom Penh in the northwest.

References

AH1
22